Abortion in China is legal and generally accessible nationwide. Abortions are available to most women through China's family planning programme, public hospitals, private hospitals, and clinics nationwide.  China was one of the first developing countries to legalize abortion and make it easily accessible in the 1950s. Following the Chinese Communist Revolution and the proclamation of the People's Republic of China in 1949, the country has periodically switched between more restrictive abortion policies to more liberal abortion policies and reversals.  Abortion regulations may vary depending on the rules of the province; in Jiangxi and Guizhou, non-medically necessary abortions after 14 weeks of pregnancy are not allowed, while throughout most of China elective abortions are legal after 14 weeks. Although sex-selective abortions are illegal nationwide, they were previously commonplace, leading to a sex-ratio imbalance in China which still exists.

In the past, virtually universal access to contraception and abortion for its citizens by a national government service was a common way for China to contain its population in accordance with its now-defunct one-child policy. It was scaled back when the policy was removed in 2015 in favor of a two-child policy and in turn was replaced by a three-child policy in 2021. In 2022, the National Health Commission announced that it would direct measures toward reducing non-medically necessary abortions through a number of measures, including expanded pre-pregnancy healthcare, infant care services, and local government efforts to boost family-friendly work places.

History
Traditional Chinese values regard life as beginning at birth. As a result, although public debates over abortion policy have sometimes been contentious, they rarely involve strong "pro-life" or "pro-choice" views.

Nationalist era 
In the era of the China's Nationalist government, the state emulated the late Qing dynasty reformers and Western governments in imposing a blanket ban on abortion. Beginning in 1935, the Nationalist government allowed abortion for women with life-threatening pregnancies. The events of the Second Sino-Japanese War and the Chinese Civil War prompted the Nationalist government to promote natalism and to restrict birth control access and limit abortion.

People's Republic of China 
In the early 1950s, the Chinese government made abortion illegal other than when 1) the mother had a preexisting condition, such as tuberculosis or pernicious anemia, that would cause the pregnancy to be a threat to the mother's life; 2) when traditional Chinese medicine could not settle an overactive fetus and spontaneous abortion was expected; and 3) when the mother had already undergone two or more Caesarean sections. Punishments were written into the law for those who received or performed illegal abortions.

China was one of the first developing countries to legalize abortion and make it easily accessible. Following the proclamation of the People's Republic of China in 1949, the country has periodically switched between more restrictive abortion policies to more liberal abortion policies and reversals. In 1953, the Ministry of Health under Li Dequan prepared the Regulation of Contraception and Induced Abortion which legalized access to the services in certain conditions. Urban areas had more access to abortion than the rural areas which maintained many restrictions on family planning Later, in 1954 and 1956, the law was extended to include other pre-existing illnesses and disabilities, such as hypertension and epilepsy, as well as allowing women working in certain types of occupations to qualify. Women who had already had four children and became pregnant four months after giving birth to their last child also qualified for an abortion. Abortion laws were further liberalized in 1957 by the Ministry of Health. Despite this, abortion remained restricted in many circumstances and in 1958 many family planning measures were rolled back. In the early 1960s, reproductive rights saw a return in certain areas of China such as Shanghai. However, with the commencement of the Cultural Revolution in 1966, all family planning initiatives were ended.

These restrictions were seen as the government's way of emphasizing the importance of population growth. The scholar Nie Jing-Bao explains that these laws were relaxed in the late 1950s and early 1960s with the intent of reducing the number of deaths and lifelong injuries women sustained due to illegal abortions as well as serving as a form of population control when used in conjunction with birth control. 

By the 1970s, abortion was officially termed a "remedial measure" for realizing China's goals of controlling the population. 

As a result of abortion legalization in China (and India), a majority of Asians have legal access to abortion services. In 2004, Guizhou enacted a ban on abortions in non-medically necessary cases after 14 weeks of pregnancy.

In Jiangxi, pregnant women older than 14 weeks are required to obtain approval from three medical professionals stating that the procedure is medically necessary.

In 2021, the China Family Planning Association, an official Chinese Communist Party-backed organization and China's chief administrative authority, the State Council, published new national guidelines with the goal of reducing abortion for non-medical reasons. The organization recommended that provincial governments should aim to reduce the number of abortions performed for "non-medical purposes" and promote instead alternate methods of contraception and birth control, and increase spending on social programs aimed at improving access to pre-pregnancy health care services and post-childbirth family planning services. However, restrictions on birth control methods have occurred, such as the limiting of access to vasectomies and contraception. That change in policy is seen by many analysts as being motivated by the declining birth rate in China.

In August 2022, the National Health Commission announced that it would direct measures toward "reducing abortions that are not medically necessary." The announced support measures include improvements with regard to insurance and taxation, improvements for education and housing, and encouraging local governments to boost infant care services and family friendly workplaces.

Statistics

China generally has one of the highest abortion rates in the world. In 2018, The National Health Commission of China reported that more than 9 million abortions are performed annually in China, down from approximately 13 million annually as of 2015. For 2020, the number of abortions in China dropped further, to just under 9 million.  

The Guttmacher Institute, a research organization that promotes abortion rights, released a study in which it estimated China's abortion rate for the years of 2015-2019 was at a rate of 49 abortions per 1000 reproductive-aged women, one of the highest rates in Eastern and Southeastern Asia.

According to local studies in China, most Chinese women who elect abortions have never had children.

Sex-selective abortion

The practice of pre-natal sex determination and sex-selective abortions in China for non-medical reasons are illegal. Nevertheless, sex-selective abortions are still relatively commonplace in China, particularly in rural areas, and particularly since the widespread proliferation of ultrasound sex determination in the 1980s. Sex-selective abortion continues to be one of the key factors in the notably imbalanced sex-ratio in China; the imbalance cannot be explained solely by the underreporting of female births or by excess female infant mortality. In 2001, 117 boys were born to every 100 girls. These trends are explained by the persistence of a preference for sons in Chinese families. 

In 2005, the government began an Action Plan consisting of ten policies with the aim of normalizing the sex ratio of newborns by 2010. Under this plan, sex-selective abortion was outlawed, as was prenatal sex diagnosis, and harsher punishments were implemented for violating both.  Other policies include controlling the marketing of ultrasonic B machines and improving the systems used by medical and family planning organizations to report on births, abortions, and pregnancies.

Abortion methods
For much of the 20th century, intentional overdose of the malaria medicine quinine was a common method for women in China (as well as other countries) to terminate a pregnancy.

Abortion's importance as a family planning tool is evident in today's China through the extensive implementation of medical abortions (abortion induced by pills, which can be performed in early pregnancy). The use of abortion pills is promoted by Chinese doctors due to its high efficacy rates (90-97% for domestically produced mifepristone, 95% for domestically produced RU-485) and its much less invasive nature compared to surgical abortion. Since at least 2001, China has banned drugstore sales of mifepristone (RU-486) tablets, while the drug can be procured and used legally under the care of a doctor at a certified hospital.

See also 
 Female infanticide in China
 List of Chinese administrative divisions by gender ratio

References

 
Chinese law